Uncial 061 (in the Gregory-Aland numbering), α 1035 (Soden); is a Greek uncial manuscript of the New Testament, dated palaeographically to the 5th century.

Description 
The codex contains a part of the First Epistle to Timothy (3:15-16; 4:1-3; 6:2-8), on two small leaves (14 cm by 12 cm), both damaged. The text is written in one column per page, 19 lines per page. 

The Greek text of this codex is a representative of the Byzantine text-type with some singular readings. Aland placed it in Category V.

Codex 061 is cited in the Textual Apparatus of the UBS-4, but not in that of the Nestle-Aland edition. It has a singular reading of ᾧ ἐφανερώθη (he revealed) in 1 Timothy 3:16.

It is dated by the INTF to the 5th century.

The codex is located now in Louvre (Ms. E 7332), in Paris.

See also 
 List of New Testament uncials
 Textual criticism

References

Further reading 

 Theodor Zahn, Forschungen zur Geschichte des neutestamentlichen Kanons III, Supplementum Clementinum (Erlangen, 1884), pp. 277-278.
 B. Reicke, Les Deux Fragments grecs onciaux de I Tim. appelés 061 publiés, Coniectanea Neotestamentica 11 (Uppsala, 1947), pp. 196-206.

External links 

 Uncial 061 at the Encyclopedia of Textual Criticism 

Greek New Testament uncials
5th-century biblical manuscripts
Manuscripts of the Louvre